The Book is a 2008 EP by Canadian rapper D-Sisive. The release was nominated for "Rap Recording of the Year" at the 2009 Juno Awards.

Track listing
 Intro (The Story of an Artist)
 Brian Wilson
 Ambulance (featuring Tom Waits)
 ThisIsWhatItSoundsLikeWhenWhiteboysListenToHipHop
 Up
 Kneecaps
 Laundry Room
 Lights Out

References

2008 EPs
D-Sisive albums